Jan Furtok (born 9 March 1962) is a Polish former professional footballer who played as a striker.

Career
Born in Katowice, Furtok played for a few clubs, including GKS Katowice (Polish cup winner in 1986) and Hamburger SV and Eintracht Frankfurt, both in (West) Germany.

Jan Furtok played for Poland national team, for which he played 36 matches and scored 10 goals. He was a participant at the 1986 FIFA World Cup. His goal scored by hand rescued Poland from humiliating goalless home draw against San Marino in 1994 FIFA World Cup qualification.

Career statistics

International goals
Scores and results list Poland's goal tally first, score column indicates score after each Furtok goal.

Honours
GKS Katowice
 Polish Cup: 1986

References

External links
 
 
 

1962 births
Living people
Sportspeople from Katowice
Polish footballers
Association football forwards
Poland international footballers
1986 FIFA World Cup players
GKS Katowice players
Hamburger SV players
Eintracht Frankfurt players
Bundesliga players
Polish football managers
GKS Katowice managers
Polish expatriate footballers
Polish expatriate sportspeople in Germany
Expatriate footballers in Germany